Asuridia phoenicea is a moth of the family Erebidae. It is found on Goodenough Island.

References

Nudariina
Moths described in 1914